Sabougla Creek is a stream in the U.S. state of Mississippi.

Sabougla is a name derived from the Choctaw language possibly meaning "smoke". Variant names are "Sabola", "Sabougala", "Sabougla Hatchie River", "Sabula Hatchie", and "Sobola".

References

Rivers of Mississippi
Rivers of Calhoun County, Mississippi
Rivers of Webster County, Mississippi
Mississippi placenames of Native American origin